François Villiers (2 March 1920 – 29 January 2009) Chevalier of the Legion of Honor was a French film director. He was responsible for several films, from Hans le marin in 1949, to Manika, une vie plus tard, in 1989, which won the Prix du Public at Cannes.

Family
He was the younger brother of actor Jean-Pierre Aumont and therefore uncle of Tina Aumont. His mother's uncle was well-known stage actor Georges Berr (died 1942).

Filmography

Television

References

External links

The Complete Index To World Film since 1895

2009 deaths
1920 births
French military personnel of World War II
Chevaliers of the Légion d'honneur
Film directors from Paris
Place of death missing